Florian Allgauer (born 7 January 1979) is an Italian former professional tennis player.

Tennis career
A native of South Tyrol, Allgauer was a promising player at junior level and won the Trofeo Bonfiglio (Italian juniors) in 1997, ending the year ranked 14th in the world. On the professional tour he reached a career high singles ranking of 216 and made his only ATP Tour main draw appearance in 1999 at the Merano Open. He featured in the qualifying draw for the 2000 Wimbledon Championships.

Personal life
Allgauer was in a relationship with tennis player Flavia Pennetta in the early 2000s.

ITF Futures titles

Singles: 1

Doubles: 1

References

External links
 
 

1979 births
Living people
Italian male tennis players
Sportspeople from Bruneck